María Irigoyen and Barbora Krejčíková were the defending champions, but chose not to participate.

Mihaela Buzărnescu and Elise Mertens won the title, defeating Usue Maitane Arconada and Katie Swan in the final, 6–0, 6–2.

Seeds

Draw

References 
 Draw

Abierto Tampico - Doubles